1 Journal Square is a skyscraper complex at Journal Square in Jersey City, New Jersey proposed by the Kushner Companies. The initial version consisted of two towers with roughly 3,000 residential units and 160,000 square feet of commercial space, but the project has been scaled back as of 2020.

There was a previously approved design by Becker + Becker Associates that was being developed by Harwood Properties. Construction was never started on the project and Harwood eventually sold the property in January 2015.

In August 2019, Kushner Companies lost a lawsuit in which they claimed they were unfairly denied tax abatements due the project. The company and Jersey City later entered into a settlement agreement  where Kushner agreed to make a $2.5 million investment in local arts initiatives in exchange for the project's approval.

One Journal Square's latest version is set to include twin 52-story high-rises over a 12-story base rising 710 feet to be built in two phases. The entire project includes 1,723 residential units, 41,000-square feet of retail space, and a 883-space parking garage. A sprucing up of the plaza outside the Journal Square PATH station is included in the development’s plans.

See also
List of tallest buildings in Jersey City
Journal Squared

References

External links

Skyscrapers in Jersey City, New Jersey